Albion: A Quarterly Journal Concerned with British Studies was a peer-reviewed history journal publishing articles on aspects of British history of any period. It was published quarterly at Appalachian State University for the North American Conference on British Studies (NACBS) from 1969 until 2004, at which point it was merged into an expanded version of the NACBS's other journal, the Journal of British Studies, starting with volume 44 of the latter.

See also
 Historiography of the United Kingdom
 Social history

References

External links

Defunct journals of the United States
British history journals
Publications established in 1969
Publications disestablished in 2004